Sigdash may refer to:
Sığdaş, a village in Azerbaijan
Sig dashes, formatting indicator for e-mail signatures